Jerrold Yam is a Singaporean poet and lawyer whose poetry has been widely published and anthologised.

Biography 
Yam completed secondary education as well as the International Baccalaureate Diploma Programme at Anglo-Chinese School (Independent) in 2009. He then read Law at University College London, from which he graduated with first-class honours (in addition to receiving the Dean's List award) in 2015. Yam currently works as a corporate lawyer in the City of London.

Literary career 

In 2012, Yam was nominated for the Pushcart Prize, making him then the youngest Singaporean to be nominated at 20 years old. His first collection of poetry, Chasing Curtained Suns, was published that same year by Math Paper Press.

Yam's works have been published in more than a hundred publications across twenty countries, including Ambit, Axon, Hayden's Ferry Review, Mascara Literary Review, Oxford Poetry, Prairie Schooner, Quarterly Literary Review Singapore, Wasafiri and Washington Square Review.

His poems have also been anthologised in Lines Spark Code (Ethos Books, 2017), which is included in the Singapore A-Level literature syllabus, A Luxury We Cannot Afford (Math Paper Press, 2015), Kulit: Asian Literature for the Language Classroom (Pearson, 2014), Manoa (University of Hawai‘i Press, 2014) and Mildly Erotic Verse (Emma Press, 2013).

He was a featured author at the Interrobang Book Fair (2013), London Book Fair (2013), Ledbury Poetry Festival (2014), SEA Arts Fest (2014) and Singapore Writers Festival (2013 to 2015), and was also an invited speaker at the Southbank Centre's Festival of Love (2014).

Yam described his debut collection Chasing Curtained Suns as being a voice for his generation, exploring the "transition from adolescence to adulthood" and "what growing up truly means in the context of modern and painfully practical Singapore". The collection "draws inspiration from National Service, celebrity culture, young love and [Singaporean localities such as] Upper Thomson Road."

He tackles similar subjects in his second and third collections, but with greater scrutiny on "[his] own weaknesses", and the "sum of [his] collected fears" in Scattered Vertebrae. The collection is "driven by psychological, emotional and physical desire, ... and [is] a genuine celebration of life’s perplexing lots." The Straits Times mentioned that "the recurring motif then, in this collection, is the dichotomy between wholeness and brokenness, and that of creation and destruction, which the title – Scattered Vertebrae – bears out beautifully."

His third collection, Intruder, explores "themes of impermanence and displacement" and the idea of home as constantly evolving. The Straits Times mentioned that "filial duties, family ties and the search for identity are the themes of Yam’s heartfelt personal poetry."

Yam's poems have been translated into Mandarin and Spanish. His inspirations include Cyril Wong, Sharon Olds and Louise Glück.

Works

Poetry collections 

 Chasing Curtained Suns (Math Paper Press, 2012) 
 Scattered Vertebrae (Math Paper Press, 2013) 
 Intruder (Ethos Books, 2014)

References 

1991 births
Singaporean people of Chinese descent
21st-century Singaporean writers
Singaporean poets
Anglo-Chinese School alumni
Alumni of University College London
21st-century poets
Singaporean male writers
Living people